Detroj is a village located in Ahmedabad district, Gujarat state, India. This village is the headquarters of Detroj-Rampura taluka, a taluka established in 2000.

References

Neighbourhoods in Ahmedabad